The Seagull is a 1972 Soviet film adaptation of the 1896 play of the same name by Anton Chekhov. It was directed by Yuli Karasik and its music was written by Alfred Schnittke.

Plot
Beside a lake on his land, Sorin helps his nephew Treplev set up the first production of his play. The main actor is Nina, with whom Treplev is in love. The audience includes celebrities like Treplev's mother, the actress Arkadina, and her lover Boris Trigorin. For Nina and Treplev the show is of major importance, as they both dream of a future in the theatre. However, the audience is distracted and Arkadina talks through it under her breath, accusing the play of being decadent. Feeling humiliated and overlooked, Treplev calls off the play and later drops a dead seagull at Nina's feet, announcing "I will kill myself in the same way". Later Trigorin seduces Nina and confesses to her "A subject is coming to me full of life... that of a short story: a woman lives beside a lake from her childhood... like you. She loves this lake like a seagull, like a seagull she is happy and free. But a man arrives, by chance, and causes her death, just as this seagull died." Shortly afterwards they leave for town and Nina follows. Two years later, we return to the same setting - Treplev still lives there and is now a well-known writer. The audience learns that Nina's love for Trigorin was unrequited and that her acting career was a disappointment.

Cast
 Alla Demidova : Irina Arkadina Nikolaevna, actress
 Vladimir Tchetverikov : Konstantin Gavrilovitch Treplev, her son
 Nikolai Plotnikov : Piotr Nikolaïévitch Sorin, her brother
 Lioudmila Savelieva : Nina Zaretchnaïa, daughter of a rich landowner
 Valentina Telichkina : Macha, daughter of lieutenant Chamraïev 
 Yury Yakovlev : Boris Alexeyevich Trigorin, writer
 Armen Djigarkhanian : Ilya Chamraïev
 Sofia Pavlova : Paulina Andreïévna, Chamraïev's wife
 Sergueï Torkachevski : Medvedenko, teacher
 Yefim Kopelyan : Dorn, doctor

External links

Чайка (1970) // Фильмы // Энциклопедия отечественного кино
La Mouette de Youli Karassik (1972) - Analyse et critique du film - DVDClassik

1972 films
Soviet drama films
Russian drama films
Films based on plays by Anton Chekhov
Films directed by Youli Karassik
Films scored by Alfred Schnittke
1972 drama films